Aromatic sulfonation is an organic reaction in which a hydrogen atom on an arene is replaced by a sulfonic acid functional group in an electrophilic aromatic substitution. Aryl sulfonic acids are used as detergents, dye, and drugs.

Stoichiometry and mechanism

Typical conditions involve heating the aromatic compound with sulfuric acid:
C6H6 + H2SO4 → C6H5SO3H + H2O
Sulfur trioxide or its protonated derivative is the actual electrophile in this electrophilic aromatic substitution.

To drive the equilibrium, dehydrating agents such as thionyl chloride can be added.
C6H6 + H2SO4 + SOCl2 → C6H5SO3H + SO2 + 2 HCl

Chlorosulfuric acid is also an effective agent:
C6H6 + HSO3Cl → C6H5SO3H + HCl

In contrast to aromatic nitration and most other electrophilic aromatic substitutions this reaction is reversible. Sulfonation takes place in concentrated acidic conditions and desulfonation is the mode of action in a dilute hot aqueous acid. The reaction is very useful in protecting the aromatic system because of this reversibility. Due to their electron withdrawing effects, sulfonate protecting groups can be used to prevent electrophilic aromatic substitution. They can also be installed as directing groups to affect the position where a substitution may take place.

Specialized sulfonation methods
Many method have been developed for introducing sulfonate groups aside from direction sulfonation.

Piria reaction
A classic named reaction is the Piria reaction (Raffaele Piria, 1851) in which nitrobenzene is reacted with a metal bisulfite forming an aminosulfonic acid as a result of combined nitro group reduction and sulfonation.

Tyrer sulfonation process
In the Tyrer sulfonation process (1917), at some time of technological importance, benzene vapor is led through a vessel containing 90% sulfuric acid the temperature of which is increased from 100 to 180°C. Water and benzene are continuously removed in a condenser and the benzene layer fed back to the vessel. In this way an 80% yield is obtained.

Applications
Aromatic sulfonic acids are intermediates in the preparation of dyes and many pharmaceuticals. Sulfonation of anilines lead to a large group of sulfa drugs.

Sulfonation of polystyrene is used to make sodium polystyrene sulfonate, a common ion exchange resin for water softening.

Reactions of aryl sulfonic acids
As a functional group, aryl sulfonic acids undergo desulfonation when heated in water:
RC6H4SO3H + H2O → RC6H5 + H2SO4

When treated with strong base, benzenesulfonic acid derivatives convert to phenols.
C6H5SO3H + 2 NaOH → C6H5OH + Na2SO4 + H2O

See also
Electrophilic halogenation
Nitration
Perchlorylbenzene

References

Substitution reactions